Josh Rotham (born 25 February 1998) is an Australian rules footballer who plays for the West Coast Eagles in the Australian Football League (AFL). He was selected at pick #37 in the 2016 national draft.  He made his senior debut against Collingwood in Round 3 of the 2019 season. Rotham won the Grand Final sprint for the 2021 AFL Grand Final, raising $5,000 for charity.

References

External links

West Coast Eagles players
West Perth Football Club players
1998 births
Living people
Australian rules footballers from Western Australia
West Coast Eagles (WAFL) players